The Calamvale Ward is a Brisbane City Council ward covering Calamvale, Algester, Drewvale, Heathwood, Parkinson, Stretton, Larapinta, Karawatha, and part of Forest Lake. The ward has been represented by Angela Owen  of the Liberal National Party since its creation in 2016. Calamvale replaced Parkinson Ward, which itself replaced Acacia Ridge Ward.

History

Acacia Ridge Ward
In 1991, Kevin Bianchi of Labor was elected councillor for Acacia Ridge Ward. Bianchi was re-elected in 1994, 1997, 2000, and 2004, the last time with a 3.8% margin.

Parkinson Ward
The 2007 Electoral Commission Redistribution created Parkinson Ward, replacing Acacia Ridge Ward while gaining area from Richlands Ward and losing area to Karawatha and Moorooka Ward. These changes decreased the Labor margin from 3.8% to 1.3%. Bianchi did not contest the 2008 election, and Angela Owen-Taylor of the Liberal National Party went on to win with a 7.6% swing. Owen-Taylor was re-elected in 2012 with a further 10.7% swing.

Calamvale Ward
The 2015 Electoral Commission Redistribution created Calamvale Ward, replacing Parkinson Ward while gaining area from the former Karawatha Ward in the east and losing area to Forest Lake and Moorooka Ward in the west. These changes increased the LNP margin from 17.1% to 18.1%. Owen-Taylor went on to win the 2016 election.

Results

References

City of Brisbane wards
Brisbane localities